Maria Moles Farré (born 8 May 2003) is an Andorran footballer who plays as a midfielder for the youth team of Spanish club FC Levante Las Planas and the Andorra women's national team.

Club career
Moles is a product of Levante Las Planas in Spain.

International career
Moles capped for Andorra at senior level in a 4–2 friendly away win over Liechtenstein on 18 September 2021.

See also
List of Andorra women's international footballers

References

External links

2003 births
Living people
Andorran women's footballers
Women's association football midfielders
Andorra women's international footballers
Andorran expatriate footballers
Andorran expatriate sportspeople in Spain
Expatriate women's footballers in Spain
Andorran people of Catalan descent
FC Levante Las Planas players